General elections were held in Ghana on 7 December 2008. Since no candidate received more than 50% of the votes, a run-off election was held on 28 December 2008 between the two candidates who received the most votes, Nana Akufo-Addo of the governing New Patriotic Party and John Atta Mills of the opposition National Democratic Congress. Mills was certified as the victor by a margin of less than one percent, winning the presidency on his third attempt. It is to date the closest election in Ghanaian history.

Background
On 21 December 2006, former Vice-President John Atta Mills, who unsuccessfully ran as the National Democratic Congress (NDC) presidential candidate in 2000 and 2004, was overwhelmingly elected by NDC as its candidate for the 2008 presidential election.

Former Foreign Minister Nana Akufo-Addo was elected as the 2008 presidential candidate of the governing New Patriotic Party (NPP) at a party congress on 23 December 2007. Although he fell short of the required 50%, the second-place candidate, former Trade Minister John Alan Kyeremanten, conceded defeat and backed Akufo-Addo.

The stakes of the election were raised by the discovery of oil in Ghana and an expectation for incoming oil revenues to begin in 2010. Additionally, allegations of electoral fraud that resulted in violence following elections in Kenya and Zimbabwe and military coups d'état  in Mauritania and Guinea caused international election monitors to hope the Ghanaian elections would refurbish the image of constitutional democracy in Africa.

Presidential candidates
The following eight candidates formally registered with the Electoral Commission of Ghana.

Kwabena Adjei – A managing director of a timber company representing the Reformed Patriotic Democrats
Nana Akufo-Addo – The former Attorney General and Minister for Justice, Minister for Foreign Affairs, and a current member of Parliament representing the New Patriotic Party (NPP)
Kwasi Amoafo-Yeboah – An independent candidate
Emmanuel Ansah-Antwi – Representing the Democratic Freedom Party (DFP)
Edward Nasigri Mahama – Representing the People's National Convention (PNC)
John Atta Mills – The former Vice-President representing the National Democratic Congress (NDC)
Paa Kwesi Nduom – The former Minister for Economic Planning & Regional Cooperation, Minister for Energy, Minister for Public Sector Reform, and a current member of Parliament representing the Convention People's Party (CPP)
Thomas Nuako Ward-Brew – Representing the Democratic People's Party (DPP)

Opinion polls
A poll conducted in April 2008 showed Mills slightly ahead of Akufo-Addo. The National Commission for Civic Education conducted the poll which sampled 5,327 people. The poll also predicted a high voter turnout of 96.9%. Respondents came from coastal, middle and northern areas of the country.

Another poll conducted in October 2008 by the Angus Reid Global Monitor saw Akufo-Addo leading. The poll was conducted by interviewing 3,000 adults in all the regions of the country.

Results
Turnout on election day was very high. Since few votes were expected for other candidates than those of the two largest parties, a first-round victory for Akufo-Addo or Mills was seen as possible, but Nduom stated he wished to "surprise" the other parties by gaining enough votes to force a run-off between the two others. With 40% of the vote counted, Akufo-Addo was leading with 49.5% to Mills's 47.6%. While Mills pulled ahead afterwards, Akufo-Addo again led by a slim margin with over 70% of the votes counted.

The second round was rerun on 28 December 2008 but due to logistics problems, the Tain District alone had its run-off election on 2 January 2009 due to problems with distributing ballots. Following the voting on 28 December, Mills led by a slim margin, causing the Election Commission to state it would not announce Mills as the winner until after the election rerun in Tain. Prior to the announcement hundreds of NDC supporters converged on the election headquarters demanding that Mills be declared the victor, but were kept at bay by riot police and armed soldiers.

Fear of election day violence caused the NPP to file a lawsuit seeking to delay voting in Tain as it claimed that "the atmosphere in the rural district was not conducive to a free and fair election". The court denied the NPP's injunction request and said it would only hear the case on 5 January 2009. In response, the NPP called its supporters to boycott the vote, for which it was criticised by civil groups.

President

Parliament

By region

Aftermath
The effective management of the 2008 election by the Electoral Commission of Ghana, raised interest for African and international election reformers. In November 2009, a conference was held to analyze the 2008 election, and try to establish new standards and practices for African election commissions. Held in Accra, the conference was titled Colloquium on African Elections:Best Practices and Cross-Sectoral Collaboration. The conference was organized by a number of international election reform organizations including the National Democratic Institute, the Africa Center for Strategic Studies, the International Foundation for Electoral Systems, the Netherlands Institute for Multiparty Democracy, the Open Society Initiative for West Africa and UNDP.  Conference participants agreed to a communique that makes recommendations directed at African governments, civil society organizations, election management bodies, political parties, election monitoring and observer groups, security services, and the media to improve the credibility of elections in Africa.

See also
MPs elected in the Ghanaian parliamentary election, 2008

References

External links
Ghana-FINAL REPORT-Presidential and Parliamentary Elections 2008-February 2009 EUROPEAN UNION ELECTION OBSERVATION MISSION
Ghana Election 2008 (Friedrich-Ebert-Stiftung, Ghana)

2008 elections in Africa
2008 in Ghana
Elections in Ghana
2008
December 2008 events in Africa